Daniel Heckenberg (born 27 October 1979) is a former Scotland international rugby league footballer.

Early career
Heckenberg was born in Camden, New South Wales, Australia.

Heckenberg began his rugby career at St Gregory's College, Campbelltown, a school renowned for producing young rugby league footballers. He first played internationally as part of the Australian Schoolboys team in a match against the BARLA Young Lions. After his graduation he played for a short while as an amateur for the Eagle Vale-St Andrews junior side.

NRL
He began his professional career at National Rugby League side St. George Illawarra Dragons, progressing through the youth team and earning his first grade début in 2000. In the same year, Heckenberg made his first appearance as a Scotland international, participating in the 2000 Rugby League World Cup. He moved club in 2002, joining the Parramatta Eels, before changing team again in 2004, this time playing with the Manly-Warringah Sea Eagles. He provided much defensive support for the Sea Eagles and was held in high esteem by his peers at the club.

Harlequins Rugby League
His performances led to a transfer to Super League side Harlequins, and he soon became an important part of the team's defensive game. Heckenberg confirmed his first grade place in the beginning of his second year at the club but suffered a severe shoulder injury in a match against Bradford Bulls in May, bringing his 2007 Super League XII campaign to an end. Harlequins coach Brian McDermott described Heckenberg as a hard worker and an integral part of the team. Heckenberg underwent surgery in June to correct the problem but when he returned from injury for 2008's Super League XIII he again suffered a setback. He dislocated his shoulder in training in March 2008, resulting in a six-week absence from the team.

Representative
Heckenberg was named in the Scotland training squad for the 2008 Rugby League World Cup but was forced to withdraw from the competition due to injury.

Personal
In his spare time, Heckenberg enjoys listening to the music of the Foo Fighters and U2, and also helps to train youth rugby league players at Elmbridge Rugby League Club.

Statistics

All information taken from Harlequins RL 2008 Club Guide.

References

External links
Harlequins RL profile

1979 births
Living people
Australian people of Scottish descent
Australian rugby league players
London Broncos players
Manly Warringah Sea Eagles players
Scotland national rugby league team players
St. George Illawarra Dragons players
Parramatta Eels players
Rugby league props
Rugby league players from Sydney
Widnes Vikings players